Aoraia dinodes is a species of moth of the family Hepialidae. It is endemic to New Zealand. This moth was described by Edward Meyrick in 1890 from specimens collected in Invercargill by Captain Hutton.

The wingspan is 62–70 mm for males and about 70 mm for females. The forewing pattern is intricate or sometimes simplified fawn-brown to chocolate brown with markings in ashwhite. The hindwings are fawn to smoky brown. Adults are on wing from February to June.

References

External links

Moths described in 1890
Hepialidae
Moths of New Zealand
Endemic fauna of New Zealand
Taxa named by Edward Meyrick
Endemic moths of New Zealand